Zdíkov is a municipality and village in Prachatice District in the South Bohemian Region of the Czech Republic. It has about 1,700 inhabitants.

Administrative parts
Villages of Branišov, Hodonín, Masákova Lhota, Nový Dvůr, Putkov, Račov, Zdíkovec and Žírec are administrative parts of Zdíkov.

References

Villages in Prachatice District